The 2022–23 season is Celtic's 134th season of competitive football. They are competing in the Premiership and Scottish Cup, having won the League Cup in February 2023.

Pre-season and friendlies
Celtic held a pre-season training camp in Bad Erlach (Austria), where they played friendlies against Wiener Viktoria and Rapid Wien. The camp ended with a trip across the border to face Baník Ostrava in a match celebrating the Czechs' centenary year. On Celtic's return to Glasgow, they played Blackburn Rovers. A trip to Poland followed, where they faced Legia Warsaw in a match honouring the career of former Celtic goalkeeper Artur Boruc. Celtic's pre-season schedule concluded with Norwich City's visit to Celtic Park.

Sydney Super Cup
In November 2022, Celtic travelled to Australia to participate in the inaugural Sydney Super Cup, where they faced Sydney FC and Everton.

Scottish Premiership

The Scottish Premiership fixture list was announced on 17 June 2022. Celtic began their title defence against Aberdeen at Celtic Park.

Scottish League Cup

On 24 July, Celtic were drawn to face Ross County in the second round of the 2022–23 Scottish League Cup. On 31 August, Celtic were drawn to face Motherwell in the quarter-finals. On 19 October, Celtic were drawn to face Kilmarnock in the semi-finals. On 15 January, it was determined that Celtic would face Rangers in the final.

Scottish Cup

On 28 November, Celtic were drawn to face Greenock Morton at Celtic Park in the fourth round of the 2022–23 Scottish Cup. On 22 January 2023, Celtic were drawn to face St Mirren at Celtic Park in the fifth round. On 13 February, Celtic were drawn to face Heart of Midlothian at Tynecastle Park in the quarter-finals. On 13 March, Celtic were drawn to face Rangers in the semi-finals.

UEFA Champions League

Group stage

Celtic entered the 2022–23 UEFA Champions League at the group stage for the first time since the 2008–09 season. On 25 August, the draw for the group stage was made. Celtic were drawn in Group F along with Real Madrid, RB Leipzig and Shakhtar Donetsk.

Matches

Statistics

Appearances and goals 

|-
! colspan=14 style=background:#dcdcdc; text-align:center| Goalkeepers

|-
! colspan=14 style=background:#dcdcdc; text-align:center| Defenders

|-
! colspan=14 style=background:#dcdcdc; text-align:center| Midfielders

|-
! colspan=14 style=background:#dcdcdc; text-align:center| Forwards

|-
! colspan=14 style=background:#dcdcdc; text-align:center| Departures

|-

Notes

Goalscorers 

Last updated: 18 March 2023

Disciplinary record
Includes all competitive matches. Players listed below made at least one appearance for Celtic first squad during the season.

Hat-tricks

(H) – Home; (A) – Away; (N) – Neutral

Clean sheets
As of 18 March 2023.

Attendances

Team statistics

League table

Competition overview

Club

Management

Kit
Supplier: Adidas / Sponsors: Dafabet (front) and Magners (back)

The club is in the third year of a deal with Adidas – the club's official kit supplier.

Home: The home kit features a subtle pattern within the club's traditional green and white hoops. White shorts and hooped socks complete the look.
Away: The away kit features a black shirt with green and white pinstripes, and a shield-style club crest. The shirt is accompanied by black shorts and socks.
Third: The third kit features a light grey shirt with bright yellow details, and sleeve cuffs showcasing the geometric outline of Celtic Park. The shirt is accompanied by black shorts and light grey socks.

Transfers

In

Notes

Out

See also
 List of Celtic F.C. seasons

Notes

References

Celtic F.C. seasons
Celtic
Celtic